Blue Canyon (also, Blue Cañon) is an unincorporated community in Placer County, California. It lies at an elevation of 4695 feet (1431 m).

Blue Canyon was possibly named for the blue smoke of the camps when extensive lumbering occurred there in the 1850s. It might otherwise have been named after a miner from that same period named "Old Jim Blue".

The Blue Canyon post office operated from 1867 to 1927. The Blue Cañon post office operated from 1936 to 1942 and from 1948 to 1964.

Climate
Blue Canyon has a warm-summer Mediterranean climate (Csb) according to the Köppen climate classification system. Summers are generally warm with cool nights, while winters are moderately cold and extremely snowy, despite no month having an average low temperature below freezing.

See also
Blue Canyon – Nyack Airport
Extremes on Earth
List of weather records

References

Unincorporated communities in California
Unincorporated communities in Placer County, California